Charlie McFadden may refer to:
 Charlie McFadden (character), a character in the Critters series
 Charlie "Specks" McFadden (1895–1966), American country blues singer and songwriter